Holy Land is a term used by Jews, Christians, and Muslims to describe the Land of Israel.

Holy Land, The Holy Land or Holyland may also refer to:

Places
 Holy Land, a name often used for the Crusader states
 Holyland (Belfast), an area in Belfast, Northern Ireland, UK
 Holy Land (Liverpool), an area of south Toxteth, Liverpool, UK
 The Holyland (Wisconsin), a region in Wisconsin, US

Arts and entertainment
 Holy Land (album), an album by Brazilian power metal band Angra
 The Holy Land (album), an album by American country singer Johnny Cash
 The Holy Land (film), a 2001 Israeli drama film directed by Eitan Gorlin
 Holy Lands, a 2017 film starring James Caan
 Holyland (manga), a Japanese manga series by Kōji Mori
 Holy Land Experience, a theme park in Orlando, Florida, US
 Holy Land, a planned attraction at Ghost Town in the Sky theme park in Maggie Valley, North Carolina, US

Other uses
 Holyland Case, a legal case about the Holyland complex in Jerusalem
 Holyland Model of Jerusalem, a 1:50 scale model of the city of Jerusalem in the late Second Temple period
 Holy Land USA, a miniature representation of Jerusalem and Bethlehem in Waterbury, Connecticut
 William Hopkins Holyland (1807–1882), English accountant

See also
Holiest sites in Islam (disambiguation)